Thomas J Price (born c.1981) is a British sculptor. Reaching out (2020), Price’s first individual full figure representation of a woman, has been shown as part of the art project The Line in the East End of London. Price has also been selected to create an artwork to be unveiled in 2022 commemorating the Windrush generation for Hackney Town Hall.

Price studied at Chelsea College of Art and the Royal College of Art.  There have been major exhibitions of his work at the National Portrait Gallery, the Yorkshire Sculpture Park, and The Power Plant Contemporary Art Gallery, Toronto.

Reaching Out

The work is deliberately not based on any particular woman. She is depicted on her mobile phone. Thomas Price says “I want this sculpture to be an opportunity for people to connect emotionally with an image of someone they might not have noticed before,” Price said.

It has been installed on Three Mills Green near Stratford, east London, and is part of The Line, the city’s only dedicated public art walk, which follows the Greenwich meridian.

This is only the third statue in the United Kingdom of a black woman, and the first by a black sculptor. The other two are the one of Mary Seacole outside St Thomas’s hospital and a representation of black motherhood in Stockwell.
Reaching Out would have been the fourth if the artist Marc Quinn had succeeded in persuading authorities in Bristol to keep his pop-up sculpture of Jen Reid, the Black Lives Matter protester, longer than 25 hours. Prior to the installation of Quinn's piece, Price had been invited by TIME to contribute an article discussing the legacy of colonial monuments and the removal of the Colston statue. Within the article, Price noted "White artists are putting themselves forward to create replacement sculptures of slave owners with no sense of irony. That’s a saviour complex, and that exemplifies what is wrong, when even the solution doesn’t involve the Black experience."

References

External links 
 

1980s births
Year of birth uncertain
Living people
British sculptors
British contemporary artists
21st-century British sculptors